The 1989 Macau Grand Prix Formula Three was the 36th Macau Grand Prix race to be held on the streets of Macau on 26 November 1989. It was the sixth edition for Formula Three cars.

Entry list

Classification

Race

References

F2 Register

External links
 The official website of the Macau Grand Prix

Macau Grand Prix
Grand
Macau